The fourteenth season of the American game show television series American Ninja Warrior premiered on June 6, 2022, on NBC. A spin-off from the Japanese reality series Sasuke, it is hosted by Matt Iseman, Akbar Gbaja-Biamila, and Zuri Hall. Filming for the season is identical to the thirteenth season, as it featured less cities visited and reduced most of the audience during live taping due to the COVID-19 pandemic.

The series was officially announced by NBC in late March, though the applications were being accepted from October 21, 2021, until December 10, 2021. The full list of competitors was published on February 6, 2022. Filming for qualifiers moved to San Antonio, Texas, as opposed to the previous season, where qualifiers were held in Tacoma, Washington. The semifinals and national finals took place in Los Angeles, California and Las Vegas, Nevada, respectively, repeating the previous season. The Grand Prize and Last Ninja Standing reward were retained as $1,000,000 and $100,000, respectively. The official age requirement is 19 years old, although contestants from 15 to 19 were invited as “special guests”.

Filming for the season began on March 20, 2022, and wrapped on May 17, 2022. The season featured Split Decision for the third obstacle in qualifiers, in which competitors could choose one of two obstacles to pass. This season marks the return of Akbar's Gbajabia-Moments (for the first three episodes), a segment reprising the most unusual outings of the night, where competitors usually fail on the earlier obstacles.

For the first time on American Ninja Warrior, more than 2 athletes finished Stage 3, with 5 competitors reaching Stage 4; however, all of them timed out on the final Rope Climb, thus no one claimed the $1 million grand prize. Despite this, 16-year-old Kaden Lebsack climbed to the top of the tower faster than the others in 36.77 seconds and was declared the Last Ninja Standing for the second year in a row, earning $100,000.

Obstacles
Every qualifying course starts from Shrinking Steps and ends on a wall, where a competitor may choose either a 14.5 foot Warped Wall or an 18-foot Mega Wall, which, if completed, would give the contestant an immediate reward of $10,000. The third and balancing obstacle features Split Decision.

For the semifinals, four extra obstacles were added, starting from veteran Salmon Ladder and ending on Spider Trap. Split Decision is moved to the ninth obstacle which features a choice of either a balance obstacle or an arm strength obstacle, and the Mega Wall was removed. The top two competitors finishing their runs proceed to a Power Tower, where they race against each other to get to the finish and earn a Safety Pass. The winner may use it to retry either Stage 1 or Stage 2 at the National Finals.

For the National Finals, Split Decision moved to the final obstacle of Stage 1, reprising the obstacles from season 13. However, both of the obstacles were followed by a climb on a cargo net or a ladder, depending on a chosen obstacle. 

Bold and Italic indicates two possible variants on Split Decision.

 The obstacle was created by fans for the Obstacle Design Challenge.

San Antonio Qualifying

Los Angeles Semifinals

Las Vegas National Finals

San Antonio Qualifying
The 5 qualifiers took place in Alamodome arena in San Antonio, Texas. 
 The contestant finished the Mega Wall and was awarded $10,000
 The woman contestant passed within top 30 competitors
 The contestant is a rookie

Night 1
The first round of qualifying featured four new obstacles: Rollercoaster, the Serpent (‘Split Decision’ obstacle, along with Domino Effect), Carnival and Salmon Roll. The round tied the record of scaling the Mega Wall with four attendants. This episode 15-year old Jordan Carr, a former American Ninja Warrior Junior competitor, set a record being the youngest woman ever to beat the Warped Wall. Her mentor, veteran Flip Rodriguez, barely advanced after falling on the fifth obstacle.

The episode also marked a return of James "The Beast" McGrath after his three-year absence and his proposal to Allyssa Beird, his girlfriend and fellow ninja, who is the only veteran who couldn't advance to the semifinals. Another proposal for the episode was from veteran Vinnie Castranova. USA Olympic soccer medalist Heather O'Reilly and 70-year old John Loobey also attempted the course but could not advance.

Night 2
The round introduced another new obstacle, Piston Plunge. This episode marked the time when all top 5 women scored their places in top 30 competitors, with three of them being teammates. Joe Moravsky scaled the Mega Wall for third consecutive time, Najee Richardson returned after missing season 13 due to injury and 75-year old Dave Kozak became the oldest competitor of a season, easily making it on the first place of 'Akbar's Gbajabia-Moments'.

Among the famous participants were current WBA-NABA super featherweight boxer Abraham Nova, who couldn't pass the first obstacle and Miss Massachusetts 2019-2020 Lindsey Littlefield, who failed on the second obstacle. Veterans Jessie Graff, who has returned after missing the previous season because of her serious injuries and Sandy Zimmerman also couldn't advance to the semifinals, failing on the Serpent and Carnival. Also, silver 2020 Olympics medalist MyKayla Skinner joined Matt and Akbar and reported the run of her husband, who also failed on the Serpent.

Night 3
Another new obstacle was introduced, Kickboards, and two obstacles from the first night, Rollercoaster and Salmon Roll returned. Domino Effect and the Serpent at Split Decision were replaced by Log Runner and Burn Rubber, respectively.

Most of the veterans, including Kaden Lebsack, who was Last Ninja Standing in Season 13, Jamie Rahn, Ethan Swanson and Andrew "Roo" Yori, advanced to the semifinals. Jesse "Flex" Labreck and her fiancé, Chris DiGangi, also moved on, both passing tenth course in their ninja career.

Two former Olympians were present on a course. Former speed skater K. C. Boutiette, who now fights his daughter's 1p36 deletion syndrome attempted and advanced to semifinals on 30th place, and former artistic gymnast Shawn Johnson covered the run of her husband. The Coyote, a mascot of San Antonio Spurs, cheered the competitors from the sideline. Today was the first time 
for Akbar's Gbajabia-Moments to feature two contestants instead of three.

Night 4

Three more new obstacles were introduced: the Shattered Panes, the Despica-balls (created to promote the 2022 film Minions: The Rise of Gru) at Split Decision, and Final Frontier. Present on the sidelines in this episode was Rowdy, the mascot for the University of Texas at San Antonio Roadrunners, alongside the UTSA cheerleaders. This episode set a new record with seven women all finishing in the top 30.

Night 5

Making his ANW debut in this episode was reigning American Ninja Warrior Junior champion Jackson Erdos, who had just turned 15 prior to the filming of this competition. David Campbell and Brian Kretsch both competed again, maintaining their status as the only two competitors to ever run in every single season of the show; Campbell cleared the course to become this season's oldest finisher in qualifying. Another veteran competitor, Josh Levin, made his return for the first time since season 10 after spending the last three years attending Harvard University, where he earned his master's degree in learning design, innovation and technology.

San Antonio Qualifying Leaderboard

Los Angeles Semifinals
The semifinals took place on the lot of Universal Studios Hollywood in Los Angeles, California. Aside of the actual course stands a reformed Power Tower mini-course.

 The contestant was granted a Safety Pass for winning Power Tower
 The woman contestant finished within top 15 competitors
 The contestant is a rookie

Night 1
Three new obstacles were introduced: Kaleidoscope, Ghost Town, and Spin Zone (at Split Decision which was now on the back half of the course).

Veterans Joe Moravsky, Flip Rodriguez and Najee Richardson attempted the course and proceeded to the National Finals, as well as Joe's student, Jay Lewis, who also received a Safety Pass for winning the Power Tower race. However, despite advancing to the National Finals, both Moravsky and Richardson could not compete in the National Finals, as Moravsky's wife, Stephanie, tested positive for COVID-19, as did Richardson himself. Other notable ninjas not to advance to the finals are veteran Brett Sims, podcast Cara Mack, high school senior Matt Bradley, H.S. Sophomore Sophia Lavallee, 15-year-old Jordan Carr (the youngest woman to complete a qualifying course) thrift shop owner Jennifer Stefano, and rookie Ryan Hermstein (who participated in the semifinals despite finishing 31st overall). James Sannella, who also failed to advance in this episode, would later replace Moravsky in the National Finals.

Night 2
Two more new obstacles were added: Hopscotch and Box Office. Only one competitor, 17-year-old Evan Andrews, finished the course in this episode, though he lost out on the Power Tower race to second-place finisher "Country Boy Ninja" Josiah Singleton (who fell at Dragonback), who earned a Safety Pass to go with his first-ever trip to the National Finals. Notable competitors who did not advance to the National Finals include "Sweet-T" Tiana Webberley, clothing designer Brittany Durant, the "Cowboy Ninja" Lance Pekus, concrete worker Adam Rayl (who failed to advance to the National Finals for the first time ever), Park Superintendent Mike Beadle, mountain biker Brett Hernandez Strong, "The Reach" John Mack, high schooler Lilah Nathison, and "The Boss" Elijah Browning; American Ninja Warrior Junior champion Jackson Erdos, who also failed early in this episode, would later compete in the National Finals as the replacement for Najee Richardson (who had tested positive for COVID-19).

Night 3
Two more new obstacles were added: Over Under and Flipped Around, the latter obstacle as part of Split Decision. The Power Tower race came down to two Iowa ninjas, Levi Enright and "Cat Daddy" Jackson Twait, with Enright coming out on top in a narrow finish to earn a Safety Pass. In a shocking moment, Jesse "Flex" Labreck failed on the third obstacle, Clockwork, and ultimately failed to advance to the National Finals for the first time in her career. Her fiancé, Chris DiGangi, also fell early (his failure occurring on Hopscotch) and failed to advance to the National Finals for the second year in a row, along with the other ninjas, including veteran Maggi Thorne, high school student Devan Alexander, college graduate Nathan Green, graduate student Kyle Schulze, and lab supervisor Andrew "Roo" Yori.

Night 4
The last round of the semifinals saw roommates Austin Gray and "Gnarly Ninja" Nate Hansen face off on the Power Tower, with Hansen winning the Safety Pass after Gray unexpectedly fell from the course before he could reach the end. Siblings Isaiah and Isabella Wakeham both failed on the fifth obstacle, Kaleidoscope; Isabella advanced to the National Finals for finishing among the top three women, but Isaiah did not advance as he was not among the top 15 qualifiers. In another surprising moment, James "The Beast" McGrath also fell on Kaleidoscope, and his comeback season ended without a qualification to the National Finals. Other ninjas also not moving on, include professional wrestler Sem Garay, physical education coach DeShawn Harris, gym director Mark "The Shark" Antioquia, mechanical engineering student Jaelyn Bennett, high school student Anabella Heinrichs, basketball coach Liv Hackmann, firefighter Dan Polizzi, and college student Tristan Wyman.

Los Angeles Semifinals Leaderboard
By the end of the semifinals, no female competitor was able to reach the ninth obstacle for the first time in nine years, therefore not able to beat the semifinals course for the first time in four years. Due to testing positive for COVID-19, Najee Richardson and Joe Moravsky had to withdraw from National Finals, with their places given to notable rookies who couldn't advance by themselves.

 The contestant withdrew for the finals. Their results are listed in the leaderboard.
 The contestant (rookie) received the finals spot after the withdrawal. Their attempts are not listed in the leaderboard.

Las Vegas National Finals
The 3 nights of National Finals took place in its usual spot on Las Vegas Strip. To advance, the competitors had to finish the course in a limited amount of time to proceed to the next stage. Safety Pass could be only used in the first two stages; it would be annulled if the player advanced to the third stage without using it. 
 The contestant used Safety Pass on this stage. Only the second attempt is recorded.
 The contestant is a woman.
 The contestant is a rookie.
 The contestant is a woman rookie.
 Kaden Lebsack, who became Last Ninja Standing on Season 14.

Stage 1

Stage 2

Stage 3

Stage 4

Release

Broadcasting
On May 31, 2022, NBC revealed the premiere date and timeslot for the season. The timeslot of previous seasons, Monday 8:00, was kept, with reruns scheduled on Friday 8:00. The season airs on NBC.

Ratings

References

American Ninja Warrior
2022 American television seasons